Dunston is a civil parish in the district of South Staffordshire, Staffordshire, England. It contains six listed buildings that are recorded in the National Heritage List for England.  All the listed buildings are designated at Grade II, the lowest of the three grades, which is applied to "buildings of national importance and special interest".  The parish contains the village of Dunston and an area to the west.  The listed buildings consist of three farmhouses, a private house, a former stable block, and a church.


Buildings

References

Citations

Sources

Lists of listed buildings in Staffordshire